Aaron Greaves (born 20 November 1977) is a former Australian rules footballer who played for the Geelong Football Club and North Ballarat Football Club in the Victorian Football League (VFL). He is a development coach with the Port Adelaide Football Club in the Australian Football League (AFL).

Career 
Greaves joined Port Adelaide at the end of 2013 AFL season. He was previously the assistant midfield coach at the Melbourne Football Club from 2012 to 2013. Prior to this, Aaron was the coach of Geelong Falcons in the TAC Cup

References

Australian rules footballers from Victoria (Australia)
1977 births
Living people
North Ballarat Football Club players